Carlos Moyá was the defending champion but lost in the quarterfinals to Félix Mantilla.

Agustín Calleri won in the final 7–5, 3–6, 6–3 against Mariano Zabaleta.

Seeds

  Carlos Moyá (quarterfinals)
  David Nalbandian (second round)
  Gastón Gaudio (second round)
  Fernando González (quarterfinals)
  Juan Ignacio Chela (first round)
  Gustavo Kuerten (semifinals)
  Marcelo Ríos (quarterfinals)
  Nicolás Lapentti (first round)

Draw

Finals

Top half

Bottom half

External links
 2003 Abierto Mexicano Telefonica Movistar Draw

2003 Abierto Mexicano Telefonica Movistar
Singles